Pecorino cheeses are hard Italian cheeses made from sheep's milk. The name "" derives from pecora which means sheep in Italian.

Overview

Of the six main varieties of pecorino, all of which have Protected Designation of Origin (PDO) status under European Union law, pecorino romano is probably the best known outside Italy, especially in the United States, which has been an important export market for the cheese since the 19th century. Most pecorino romano is produced on the island of Sardinia, though its production zone also includes Lazio and the Tuscan provinces of Grosseto and Siena. Ancient Roman authors wrote about this cheese and its production technique.

The other five mature PDO cheeses are the pecorino sardo from Sardinia (casu berbeghinu in Sardinian language); pecorino toscano, whose production was already attested by Pliny the Elder in his Natural History; pecorino siciliano (or picurinu sicilianu in Sicilian) from Sicily; pecorino di Filiano from Basilicata; and pecorino crotonese from Province of Crotone in Calabria. Another well-known pecorino is the one that was produced in Abruzzo, the pecorino di Atri.

All come in a variety of styles depending on how long they have been aged. The more matured cheeses, referred to as stagionato ("seasoned" or "aged"), are harder but still crumbly in texture and have decidedly buttery and nutty flavours. The other two types, semi-stagionato and fresco, have a softer texture and milder cream and milk tastes.

Tradition

A variant from Southern Italy is pecorino pepato (literally, "peppered Pecorino"), to which black peppercorns are added. Today many other additions are made, for example walnuts, rocket, or tiny pieces of white or black truffle.

In Sardinia, the larvae of the cheese fly are intentionally introduced into pecorino sardo to produce a local delicacy called casu martzu, which means "rotten cheese". As it is illegal, casu marzu is primarily sold through the black market.

Meals may be finished with a good pecorino stagionato, served with pears and walnuts or drizzled with strong chestnut honey. Pecorino is also often used to finish pasta dishes, and used to be the natural choice for most Italian regions from Umbria down to Sicily, rather than the more expensive Parmigiano-Reggiano. It is still preferred today for the pasta dishes of Rome and Lazio, for example pasta dressed with sugo all'amatriciana, cacio e pepe, and pasta alla gricia.

See also
 Calcagno (cheese)
 List of cheeses
 List of Italian cheeses
 List of Italian PDO cheeses
 Tuma

References

External links
 

Italian cheeses
Sheep's-milk cheeses
Cuisine of Abruzzo